The 2010 Arkansas floods were flash floods that killed at least 20 people near Langley, Arkansas, United States, in the early morning of June 11, 2010.  Heavy, localized rainfall from six to eight inches (150–200 mm) flooded the Little Missouri and Caddo rivers, sweeping through campsites in the Ouachita National Forest.

Cause

The floods affected camping sites around the rivers.

A flood of this size had not occurred in the area since records began in 1988. A local resident said none such had happened since May 1968, when the site "was not the popular camping spot it is today."

Warnings were issued in advance of the flooding; however, the warnings may not have been heard due to the remoteness of the affected areas.

Effect

At least 20 people died in the floods (including at least six children), and about 24 people were missing. Many of the casualties were caused by a flood sweeping through a heavily populated campsite at the Albert Pike Recreational Area, at about 5:30 am on June 11. The flood had caught campers by surprise while they slept in their tents, and destroyed a number of cabins.

The American Red Cross estimated that over 200 people were in the areas affected by the floods at the time the floods hit. The missing were being searched for by National Guard helicopters. President Barack Obama pledged federal emergency assistance if it was required by Arkansas. Emergency management officials stated the search and rescue efforts would be difficult as the number of missing was unknown, and the missing were not necessarily confined to campsites. A logbook at the Albert Pike Recreational Area that would have helped track the whereabouts of hikers was swept away in the flood, leaving rescuers with little idea how many hikers could be missing. Rescue efforts were also hampered by roads rendered inaccessible by the flooding; some searchers used canoes or kayaks. A call center set up by the Arkansas Department of Emergency Management received inquiries in respect of 73 people who may have been missing.

In a statement, President Obama said: "Michelle and I would like to extend heartfelt condolences to the families and friends of those who lost their lives during this horrible flash flood, and we offer our prayers for those who anxiously await news of loved ones still missing."

References

External links

 "A Search for Survivors in Arkansas", photo gallery by The New York Times

Arkansas Floods, 2010
Floods in the United States
Natural disasters in Arkansas
Ouachita Mountains
Floods
June 2010 events in the United States